Abdulhameed Anad (Arabic:عبد الحميد عناد; born 20 February 1995) is a Qatari footballer.

External links
 

Qatari footballers
1995 births
Living people
Al-Rayyan SC players
Al-Shahania SC players
Al-Shamal SC players
Qatar Stars League players
Qatari Second Division players
Association football defenders